Iván Márquez (born October 4, 1981 in Caracas) is a Venezuelan professional and olympic volleyball player. His position on the field is middle blocker. He currently plays in the Greek Volley League for PAOK Thessaloniki. He also currently coaches for a league called Miami Volleyball Academy in Miami, Florida

Career
He played for the Greek team Olympiacos SC, and for the national team of Venezuela.

Before going to Olympiacos, Márquez was playing for Knack Randstad Roeselare in Belgium. Márquez is known for his very hard serve and spike through the middle, hence his nickname Bomba.

Márquez only started playing volleyball at a late age, as he was denied permission by his country to play basketball in the United States of America.

Márquez is the first son of Iván Márquez Sr. and the only child of Kais Sánchez.  He is married to Gabriela Torrealba de Marquez since 28 October 2006 and has two children.

He won with his team the gold medal at the 2005 Bolivarian Games.
Rebeca Perez is his favorite club player 

Played the 2006 Fivb World Championship in Japan where his national team occupied the 17th position. After that his biggest desire of going to the Olympic Games in Beijing 2008 came true when Venezuela beat in his final qualification game Argentina by 3-1 and accomplish the most expected dream of his career.

A year later Marquez moved to the Italian league where he signed for Vibo Valentia Tonno Callipo he has an amazing start so much that the league call him to participate in the All Start Game where his team beat the Italian National Team 3-1.

After passing quickly for the French league he returned to Italy where he defends the club of Pineto, but due to injury he has to take an intervention to repair his quadriceps tendon. He returned to the court a few months later to assist one more time to the Panamerican Games in Guadalajara, Mexico (2011) and yet come back to play another season in the Argentinian League with the Club Sarmiento Santana Textiles in Resistencia.

In 2017, he signed a contract with Sporting CP with whom he won the Portuguese Championship. He was signed to PAOK V.C. for the season 2018-2019

Awards

Individuals
 2010 Central American and Caribbean Games "Best Server" 
 2011-2012 Argentinian League "Best Spiker"

National Team
 2005 Bolivarian Games, -  Gold Medal

Clubs
 2003 Argentine League –  Champion, with Bolívar Signia
 2005 Belgium League –  Champion, with Knack Roeselaere
 2005 Belgium Cup –  Champion, with Knack Roeselaere
 2006 Belgium League –  Champion, with Knack Roeselaere
 2006 Belgium Cup –  Champion, with Knack Roeselaere
 2007 Belgium League –  Champion, with Knack Roeselaere
 2009 Greek League –  Champion, with Olympiakos Piraeus
 2009 Greek Cup –  Champion, with Olympiakos Piraeus
 2018 Portuguese Volleyball First Division -   Champion, with Sporting CP

References

External links
 CEV Profile
 Italian League Profile
 Sporting CP Player Profile

1981 births
Living people
Venezuelan men's volleyball players
Venezuelan expatriate sportspeople in Argentina
Venezuelan expatriate sportspeople in Spain
Venezuelan expatriate sportspeople in Belgium
Venezuelan expatriate sportspeople in Greece
Venezuelan expatriate sportspeople in Italy
Venezuelan expatriate sportspeople in France
Venezuelan expatriate sportspeople in Brazil
Venezuelan expatriate sportspeople in Romania
Venezuelan expatriate sportspeople in Portugal
Volleyball players at the 2008 Summer Olympics
Olympic volleyball players of Venezuela
Volleyball players at the 2003 Pan American Games
Pan American Games gold medalists for Venezuela
Olympiacos S.C. players
Sportspeople from Caracas
Pan American Games medalists in volleyball
Medalists at the 2003 Pan American Games